Jorge Nicolás Atalah Moya (born October 22, 1968 in Viña del Mar) is a Chilean sport shooter. He won a silver medal in men's skeet shooting at the 2004 ISSF World Cup in Americana, São Paulo, Brazil, with a total score of 147 points. Atalah is also the son of Nicolas Atalah, who competed in the same event at the 1968 Summer Olympics in Mexico City, Mexico.

Atalah made his official debut for the 2004 Summer Olympics in Athens, where he placed thirty-first in men's skeet shooting, with a total score of 117 points, tying his position with Barbados' Michael Maskell, Germany's Axel Wegner, and Great Britain's Richard Brickell.

At the 2008 Summer Olympics in Beijing, Atalah competed for the second time, as a 39-year-old, in men's skeet shooting. He finished only in twenty-eighth place by one point ahead of Lebanon's Ziad Richa from the final attempt, for a total score of 111 targets.

References

External links
NBC 2008 Olympics profile

Chilean male sport shooters
Skeet shooters
Living people
Olympic shooters of Chile
Shooters at the 2004 Summer Olympics
Shooters at the 2008 Summer Olympics
Sportspeople from Viña del Mar
1968 births
Shooters at the 2015 Pan American Games
Pan American Games competitors for Chile
21st-century Chilean people